The 2000 Myanmar Premier League season had 12 teams competing.

Results

See also
2003 Myanmar Premier League
2004 Myanmar Premier League
2005 Myanmar Premier League
2006 Myanmar Premier League
2007 Myanmar Premier League
2008 Myanmar Premier League

References
http://www.rsssf.com/tablesm/myan00.html

Myanmar Premier League seasons
2000–01 in Asian association football leagues
1999–2000 in Asian association football leagues
1